Macedonian Voice (Bulgarian:Македонский глас) was a Bulgarian society that existed between the end of 1884 and September 1885, working to improve the situation of the Bulgarian population under Ottoman rule of Macedonia.

History
On July 1, 1885 at the Congress in Sofia, nineteen Macedonian companies chose the Central Board of Macedonian Voice with Dimitar Rizov and Dimitar Petkov.
At the head of the company was Vasil Diamandiev. Prominent figures were Dimitar Rizov (later chairman), Yosif Kovachev, Ilia Georgov, Dimitar Petkov.

From January 5, 1885, the company began publishing the Macedonian Voice newspaper, the same name, published once a week.

References

Further reading
Енциклопедия България, том 4, Издателство на БАН, София, 1984.
Милен Куманов. "Македония. Кратък исторически справочник", София, 1993

1884 establishments in Bulgaria
1885 disestablishments in Bulgaria
Organizations established in 1884
Organizations disestablished in 1885
Bulgarian revolutionary organisations
Macedonian Question
History of Sofia